Coniraya is a large crater on the dwarf planet Ceres.

Etymology
The crater is named after the Incan lunar and fertility deity, Coniraya Viracocha (Kon Iraya Wiraqocha), who came to earth at Huarochirí (Waruchiri), and created villages, terraced fields and irrigation canals.

Formation
According to a 2016 study, the impact which created Coniraya was caused by a large body travelling an unusually low speed.

References

Impact craters on asteroids
Surface features of Ceres